"Another Town, Another Train" was a song recorded by Swedish pop group ABBA at KMH Studios.

The song was released as a 7" vinyl single in Japan in March 1973 to promote the group's debut album Ring Ring; the single was also released with the same B-side ("People Need Love") in Venezuela. "Another Town, Another Train" was also released as a single on Playboy Records in the USA, with "I Am Just A Girl" on the B-side, as a follow-up to the group's first single "People Need Love". It was released in South Africa and Rhodesia on the Sunshine label with "Rock'n Roll Band" on the B-side. The first release in the UK was on Abba's first compilation album Greatest Hits.

Written and performed in the style of Simon and Garfunkel and The Bachelors, the melodic ballad tells of the song's narrator leaving his love as "day is dawning". It was recorded in German under the title "Wer im Wartesaal der Liebe steht" (with lyrics by Fred Jay), as the B-side to the German version of "Ring Ring". With lyrics in Swedish by Stikkan Andersson, "En annan stad, en annan vän", it was covered by dance band Schytts in 1974, and by fellow Eurovision participant Kikki Danielsson in 1991 on her album "Vägen hem till dej".

Official versions
 "Another Town, Another Train" (English version)
 "Wer im Wartesaal der Liebe steht" (German version)

Charts

Cover versions
 A Swedish country band called Nashville Train (which included some of ABBA's own backing band members) covered the song in 1977 on their album ABBA Our Way, released on the Polar Music label in Sweden.

References

External links
Pictures of all singles.
Discogs. "Another Town, Another Train" master release

1973 songs
1973 singles
ABBA songs
Kikki Danielsson songs
Playboy Records singles
Songs written by Benny Andersson and Björn Ulvaeus
Songs about trains